Palais Epstein is a  in Vienna, Austria. It was built for the industrialist and banker Gustav Ritter von Epstein. The architect was Theophil Freiherr von Hansen, who also designed the adjacent Austrian Parliament Building. It is up to five storeys high and built in the neo-renaissance style typical of its time.

In 1902 it was acquired by the State and used as domicile of the Administrative Court. After conversions, it became home to the Vienna School Authority in 1922. Following the Anschluss, it housed offices of the 's building authorities.

From 1945 to 1955 (the Allied occupation of Austria), the palais was domicile of the Soviet headquarters. After that, it briefly served as a branch of the Academy of Music and Performing Arts and then again for the School Authority until 2002. After a thorough refurbishment, it has been a branch of nearby parliament ever since.

References

External links
 Palais Epstein website

Epstein
Buildings and structures in Innere Stadt
Houses completed in the 19th century
Historicist architecture in Austria
Renaissance Revival architecture in Vienna